Mandy Wright (born June 7, 1977) is an American educator and politician.

From Wausau, Wisconsin, Wright graduated from St. Olaf College and earned her master's degree in education from Viterbo University. Wright was a 6th grade teacher in Wausau. In November 2012, Wright was elected to the Wisconsin State Assembly as a Democrat. On November 4, 2014, Wright was defeated by Republican challenger David Heaton, losing by 84 votes out of over 20,000 cast  She ran again in 2016 and lost to Patrick Snyder, her Republican opponent from the first election. Wright  currently (2018) has three children; Ruby, Sylvia, and Lucy. In 2017 Wright began working at Marathon Venture Academy, a public charter school.

Electoral history

Notes 

Living people
Politicians from Wausau, Wisconsin
St. Olaf College alumni
Viterbo University alumni
Schoolteachers from Wisconsin
Women state legislators in Wisconsin
Members of the Wisconsin State Assembly
1977 births
21st-century American politicians
21st-century American women politicians
Candidates in the 2016 United States elections
21st-century American educators
21st-century American women educators